Bruce Gilliat (born May 30, 1959) is the co-founder and former chief executive officer of Alexa Internet.

References

American computer businesspeople
Amazon (company) people
Golden Gate University alumni
Place of birth missing (living people)
Living people
1959 births